Gabrio Zandonà (born 11 June 1977 in Rome) is an Italian sailor, world champion in the 470 class in 2003.

Biography
In 2003 he won gold medal at 470 World Championships in Cadiz (with Andrea Trani) and in 2009 he won gold medal at the Mediterranean Games in Pescara (with Francesco Della Torre).

In his career he participated in three editions of the Olympic Games.  He and team-mate Pietro Zucchetti came 4th at the 2012 Summer Olympics.

Achievements

See also
 ISAF World Sailor of the Year Awards

References

External links
 
 
 
 Gabrio Zandonà at the Italian Sailing Federation
 

1977 births
Living people
Sportspeople from Rome
Sailors at the 2004 Summer Olympics – 470
Sailors at the 2008 Summer Olympics – 470
Sailors at the 2012 Summer Olympics – 470
Olympic sailors of Italy
Italian male sailors (sport)
Mediterranean Games gold medalists for Italy
Competitors at the 2009 Mediterranean Games
470 class world champions
World champions in sailing for Italy
Mediterranean Games medalists in sailing
Sailors of Marina Militare